Tetrakis(hydroxymethyl)phosphonium chloride (THPC) is an organophosphorus compound with the chemical formula [P(CH2OH)4]Cl. The cation P(CH2OH)4+ is four-coordinate, as is typical for phosphonium salts. THPC has applications as a precursor to fire-retardant materials, as well as a microbiocide in commercial and industrial water systems.

Synthesis and reactions
THPC can be synthesized with high yield by treating phosphine with formaldehyde in the presence of hydrochloric acid.
PH3 + 4 H2C=O + HCl → [P(CH2OH)4]Cl

THPC converts to tris(hydroxymethyl)phosphine upon treatment with aqueous sodium hydroxide:
[P(CH2OH)4]Cl + NaOH → P(CH2OH)3 + H2O + H2C=O + NaCl

Application in textiles
THPC has industrial importance in the production of crease-resistant and flame-retardant finishes on cotton textiles and other cellulosic fabrics. A flame-retardant finish can be prepared from THPC by the Proban Process, in which THPC is treated with urea. The urea condenses with the hydroxymethyl groups on THPC.  The phosphonium structure is converted to phosphine oxide as the result of this reaction.

[P(CH2OH)4]Cl + NH2CONH2 →  (HOCH2)2POCH2NHCONH2 + HCl + HCHO + H2 + H2O

This reaction proceeds rapidly, forming insoluble high molecular weight polymers.  The resulting product is applied to the fabrics in a "pad-dry process." This treated material is then treated with ammonia and ammonia hydroxide to produce fibers that are flame-retardant.

THPC can condense with many other types of monomers in addition to urea.  These monomers include amines, phenols, and polybasic acids and anhydrides.

Tris(hydroxymethyl)phosphine and its uses
Tris(hydroxymethyl)phosphine, which is derived from tetrakis(hydroxymethyl)phosphonium chloride, is an intermediate in the preparation of the water-soluble ligand 1,3,5-triaza-7-phosphaadamantane (PTA).  This conversion is achieved by treating hexamethylenetetramine with formaldehyde and tris(hydroxymethyl)phosphine.

Tris(hydroxymethyl)phosphine can also be used to synthesize the heterocycle, N-boc-3-pyrroline by ring-closing metathesis using Grubbs' catalyst (bis(tricyclohexylphosphine)benzylidineruthenium dichloride). N-Boc-diallylamine is treated with Grubbs' catalyst, followed by tris(hydroxymethyl)phosphine. The carbon-carbon double bonds undergo ring closure, releasing ethene gas, resulting in N-boc-3-pyrroline.
The hydroxymethyl groups on THPC undergo replacement reactions when THPC is treated with α,β-unsaturated nitrile, acid, amide, and epoxides. For example, base induces condensation between THPC and acrylamide with displacement of the hydroxymethyl groups. (Z = CONH2)
[P(CH2OH)4]Cl + NaOH + 3CH2=CHZ → P(CH2CH2Z)3 + 4CH2O + H2O + NaCl

Similar reactions occur when THPC is treated with acrylic acid; only one hydroxymethyl group is displaced, however.

References

Quaternary phosphonium compounds
Flame retardants